John Harris Browne (22 April 1817 – 12 January 1904), generally referred to as J. Harris Browne, was an explorer in Australia and a pioneer pastoralist.

Early years
Browne was born in Ilford, Wiltshire, England, son of Benjamin Browne, landowner, and his wife Tara. He was well educated, studying at the Ecole de Médecine, Paris and qualified for the medical profession at the University of Edinburgh.

Career
Browne migrated to South Australia in 1840 with his sister Anna, arriving aboard the Orleanna. There he took up land, initially at Lyndoch in the Barossa Valley, and in 1844 was asked by Charles Sturt to join his expedition to Central Australia as surgeon. During this journey he was of the greatest assistance to Sturt, and when his leader fell ill with scurvy, took command of the party on the return journey and brought it to safety. Both in the official biography and in Sturt's own account of the journey to central Australia, there are many references to Browne's ability as an explorer and his loyalty to Sturt, who probably owed his life to him. He afterwards became a highly successful pastoralist and held an enormous amount of land in South Australia. In his later years he lived for long periods in England, and died in Bath.

Family life
He married and was survived by a son and daughter. Browne's elder brother, William James Browne (1815 – 4 December 1894), also qualified as a physician and arrived in South Australia in 1839, becoming a very successful pastoralist.

References

1817 births
1904 deaths
Settlers of South Australia
Explorers of Australia
Explorers of South Australia